Shooting Stars is a 1950 British documentary film about movie stars directed by Ray Densham. It was one of the earliest productions from Anglo-Amalgamated.

References

External links
Shooting Stars at BFI

1950 films
1950 documentary films
British documentary films
Documentary films about the cinema of the United Kingdom
Documentary films about actors
1950s English-language films
1950s British films